Park Place Productions was a corporation founded in 1989 by Michael Knox,  Troy Lyndon and Stephen Quinn.

History
In 1990, contracted by Electronic Arts, the company produced John Madden Football for the Genesis video game console, described as "the most successful sports game of all time." Other popular titles that the company developed include Monday Night Football (DOS, 1989), and Muhammad Ali Heavyweight Boxing (Genesis, 1992). Park Place Productions went on to become the largest independent developer of computer games in 1993 with 130 developers making 45 games for 14 video game publishing companies.

At the end of December 1993 the company collapsed. Co-founder Troy Lyndon had left two months earlier. After milestones for some of the projects hadn't been met, publishers denied further payments, which worsened the situation. One large customer that accounted for 30% of business, decided to pull out of its contracts. This led to a chain reaction with other business partners dropping their projects. Park Place Productions could not pay its employees in December 1993. Before the end of December 1993, a group of 30 employees started to work for a newly established operation of Sony Imagesoft based in San Diego's Sorrento Valley. Park Place Productions subsequently opened a lawsuit against Sony, alleging that these employees were acquired in a hostile takeover and took with them hardware, software, and proprietary source codes from Park Place.

On 15 September 2009, co-founder Michael Knox died in Kaneohe, Hawaii of colon cancer.  He was 48.

References

External links
Parks Place Productions Game List

Defunct video game companies of the United States
Video game companies established in 1989
Video game companies disestablished in 1993